This is a list of parks, historic resources, reserves and recreation areas in the California State Parks system.

List of parks

See also
California State Beaches
List of California State Historic Parks
Parks in California
California Department of Parks and Recreation

References

External links

Official California State Parks website
California State Parks Foundation

 
State parks
California state parks
California state parks
Park
State parks
 Park